Benelli Q.J. is an Italian company, based in the city of Pesaro in the Marche region, that produces motorcycles and scooters.

Since 2005 Benelli is owned by the Qianjiang Motorcycle, a Chinese company owned by the Geely Holding Group. Originally founded in 1911 in Pesaro, Benelli is the second oldest Italian motorcycle company still in business.

Design, development and marketing activities are carried out at the Benelli QJ headquarters in Pesaro, Italy, in synergy with the parent company of Wenling China where motorcycles are produced.

History

From founding to World War II 

Benelli was established in Pesaro, Italy  in 1911, which possibly makes it the oldest of Italian motorcycle factories in operation. (Moto Guzzi—the oldest motorcycle factory in non-stop operation—was established in 1921, and Peugeot is the world's oldest and still producing motorcycle factory due to establishing in 1898.)
After losing her husband, the widow Teresa Boni Benelli invested all of the family capital into the business in the hope that it would offer stable work for her six sons: Giuseppe, Giovanni, Francesco, Filippo, Domenico and Antonio ("Tonino"). She also sent Giuseppe and Giovanni to study Engineering in Switzerland. Initially the business had 6 employees in addition to the 5 brothers working (Tonino didn't work because he was too young.)

In the beginning, it was just the Benelli Garage, which repaired bicycles and motorcycles, but was already able to produce all of the spare parts needed for repairs. During World War I, Benelli worked hard fixing parts for the Italian machines in war and in 1919 the first motorcycle was presented to the public. In 1920 the company built its first complete engine in-house, a single-cylinder two-stroke 75 cc model, immediately adapted to a bicycle frame. A year later in 1921, Benelli built its first motorcycle, using their own engine which had by then become a 98 cc model.

But the most successful engine, which made Benelli known in the national and international field, was the 175 cm³ 4-stroke with "cascade" distribution and overhead camshaft of 1927, a bold and sophisticated solution that soon became the "trademark" of the Pesaro house. Giuseppe Benelli was inspired by a theoretical study of an engine by Edward Turner published in 1925 in the French magazine Moto Revue. Giuseppe, in order to beat the competition, did not waste time and completely reinterpreted that project introducing an ingenious simple solution to eliminate the negative effects of thermal expansion that afflicted these applications.

The five cylindrical gears with straight teeth of the distribution (one of the crankshaft, three idle, one of the camshaft) were inserted (cascade) in a thin aluminum folder placed on the right side of the engine, on the top of which was mounted the "castelletto" of the distribution with the camshaft and barbells annexed. The whole was fixed to the engine head not rigidly, but leaving the coupling with a degree of freedom. The solution consisted in inserting two screws with the stem partially threaded (columns) in two holes in the castle and screwed on the two of the four prisoners of the thermal head. The threaded part joined firmly to the head, while the part of the threaded screw created a free, but very precise coupling with the two holes in the castle. The screws were tightened so as not to "crush" the castle, but so that they could leave a play of a few tenths of a millimeter sufficient to the two "blocks" (folder-castle/ cylinder-head) to flow over each other in the phase of expansion by the effect of heat, without interfering and creating those deformations that would have made the system unreliable. This solution was patented in 1927 and began the commercial and sporting success of Benelli, which lasted until the outbreak of World War II. (Patent No. 255634 of 29 Oct. 1927 "Arrangement for forming and fixing the transmission box for controlling the distribution shaft at the head in combustion engines")

Two years after that, using a version specially designed for competitions, Tonino "the terrible" took to the track. He displayed an extraordinary natural talent as a rider and embarked on a very successful career which confirmed the company's exceptional capacity for development and production. Riding a Benelli 175, Tonino Benelli won four Italian championship titles in five years: in 1927, 1928 and 1930 with engine single overhead camshaft (SOHC) version, and in 1931 with the double overhead camshaft (DOHC) version. Unfortunately, a bad crash in the GP of the Tigullio in 1932 put an end to his short and brilliant career; on 27 September 1937 Tonino died following a road accident.

As World War II loomed, the Benelli company debuted with a motorcycles with engine four-cylinder in line supercharged 250cc designed for racing with double overhead camshaft, liquid cooled and with a vane compressor, credited with a maximum power of 52 hp at 10,000 rev/min and a maximum speed of 230 km/h. This motorcycle was intended to compete in the 1940 season to try to bissare the Benelli's success in the 1939 Isle of Man TT Lightweight 250 cc race, but the outbreak of the Second World War will frustrate all efforts and this solution (banned in the post-war period) will never be used in official competitions.

After World War II

At the end of the conflict, much of the factory was destroyed, the equipment dispersed or damaged and it took three or four years to restart the business in a situation of precariousness and misery. To replenish the scarce financial resources, the Benelli acquired a thousand motorcycles abandoned by the belligerent armies on the battlefields to refurbish them for civil use.

Giuseppe Benelli, after irreconcilable disputes with his brothers about productive strategies, split from the company to found first the BBC Automobili in 1946 and after MotoBi in 1952. The management of Benelli factory will pass to the second brother Giovanni who, although not having the design talents of his older brother, had great organizational skills having always managed the productive apparatus of the company. Under his direction Giovanni provides designers with the guidelines of the model of rebirth: the new motorcycle must be light, reliable and cheap. This is how the Letizia model was born, equipped with a two-stroke engine (cheaper than 4-stroke) of 98 cm³ with four bench bearings, mounted on an essential frame, but elastic on both axes. ″Letizia″ will be the motorcycle forerunner of the most famous model of the Benelli postwar: the ″Leoncino″ (little lion). It was produced from 1950 to 1960 in about 45,000 units, the most common motorization was the 125 cm³ 2 stroke, but also 150 cm³ for the version "three wheel" and 125 cm³ 4 stroke with distribution to "cascade of gears", immediately abandoned solution for reliability problems.

Since the 1960s, at a time of major market crisis in Italy, Benelli has been saving its balance with exports to the US. In the sixties he chose two different routes to sell overseas: via the importer Cosmopolitan and with the Montgomery Ward and presented the following models:
 Tornado 650: the twin-cylinder maxi was marketed first in the US and then in Europe. The superstructures are completely different, but the peculiarity is the chassis type Metisse, wanted by Steve McQueen. The actor was the image of the importer Cosmopolitan and Montgomery Ward. Benelli claimed at the time of launch that the Tornado was capable of 57 hp at 7,400rpm for a top speed of 117 mph. The Tornado (later the Tornado S) was discontinued after 1974, when Benelli introduced a series of "multis" intended to compete with Japanese triples and fours.
 Mojave 260/360: used the chassis and superstructures of the Tornado while the 4-stroke engine was an increase of 175 cc. The motorbike, proposed also in preparation Scrambler, could be bought in store.
 Buzzer/Hurricane/Dynamo/Hornet: small wheeled scooter with 65 cc engine (instead of 50 cc sold in Italy). Compared to the models sold in Italy, the names and some details changed.
 Volcano: low-wheeled "scooter" derived from the Mini Cross but with a displacement of 180 cc.

The management of Alejandro de Tomaso 
Towards the end of the 1960s, the arrival of Japanese manufacturers caused a crisis in the European motorcycle industry. The original Benelli company was heavily involved in the American motorcycle market, selling motorcycles under 350cc through Montgomery Ward. The advent of competition from Japan led to Benelli products (still largely of single cylinder pushrod design) losing popularity as they were perceived as old-fashioned in comparison to Hondas of the era which sported overhead cam engines with electric starters, in much the same way as the British motorcycle manufacturers such as Norton, BSA and Triumph were affected in the larger capacity sector.

The Benelli, in obvious economic difficulty, will be purchased by the Italian-Argentine industrialist Alejandro de Tomaso, who was undoubtedly one of the most discussed and powerful figures in Italy in the '60s, '70s and '80s. In 1959 he founded De Tomaso automobili in Modena and made his own series of road and racing cars. He then acquired a number of Italian companies such as Maserati, Innocenti, Ghia and Vignale and then, in 1971, Benelli and the competitor Moto Guzzi in 1973. De Tomaso therefore had many diversified interests, acquired companies in difficulty and then restructured them and tried to sell them back, pocketing the capital gains. His approach evidently had no forward-looking industrial continuity, so that in his acquisitions there were more "shadows" than "lights". Benelli is no exception, which will live the most troubled period of its centenary history.

The Italian-Argentine manager, in order to challenge the Japanese manufacturers, immediately asks the designers to copy a Honda CB500 Four engine to save time and money. Thus was born the 500 Quattro (1974) which will be the basis of the 750 Sei with its six-cylinder engine in line, first in the world on a road motorcycle. Experts in the field judged the 750 Sei an easy-to-ride motorcycles, with good engine elasticity, exceptional roadholding and excellent brakes. The only downside was the ignition that had to bring the power at the right time to the candles. In 1974 it became "Moto dell'anno" and in 1975 there were the first deliveries. It had a top speed of 200 km/h, 75 hp at 9500 rpm and was produced in 3200 units until 1977. This industrial policy, combined with little investment in plant and research, with a quality of materials that is not up to the competition, with a lack of distribution and after-sales network, will soon prove to be harmful. Then, the final blow, will be caused by the merger with the acerrima and historical rival (in racing) Moto Guzzi in the Guzzi-Benelli Moto (G.B.M. S.p.a.) that will transform the Benelli in an empty box.

Benelli motorcycles from the 1970s and 1980s, particularly the 750 Sei, often command higher prices than their contemporaries on the secondhand market.

The management of Andrea Merloni

After a failed attempt of rebirth in 1989 supported by the Pesaro industrialist Giancarlo Selci, operating in the field of woodworking machinery and ex machine operator in the Benelli factory, in December 1995 there was the decisive turning point: the young Andrea Merloni, at only 28 years old, scion of family of the famous Marche dynasty of household appliances and passionate motorcyclist, has decided to take over the Benelli brand to relaunch it on the world market, first by opening a new factory in Strada della Fornace Vecchia, where Benelli itself is still based today, then entered the most difficult sectors, using young and dynamic designers, launching a series of scooters and maximoto to give immediate oxygen to the crates and organize the sales network and assistance.

So, in just over a year from the acquisition, were placed on the market the first new products such as models Adiva (in the displacement 125 and 150) equipped with rigid canopy foldable in the trunk (first scooter in the world to be equipped with this mechanism, then copied by the competition), the Velvet (in the displacement 125, 150, 250, 400) which remained in the list until 2012, the 491, very popular among fourteen-year-olds of the time, that mounted a rare horizontal Morini engine of 50 cm³ at 2 times with liquid cooling and that made it one of the most performing of the lot, the K2 (50 and 100 cm³) and the Pepe (of 50 cm³ then became the best-selling Benelli scooter in recent years); the latter, powered by a Minarelli engine, had a good commercial success.

In 1999 was hired the technician Riccardo Rosa (ex Cagiva) and was then presented the new Tornado Tre, a sports bike (900 cm³, then brought to 1130 cm³), with interesting technological innovations. It was in fact a pure sports bike, equipped with a 3-cylinder engine in-line that presented a new arrangement of the cooling radiator positioned under the rear tail and equipped with two forced air extraction fans of spectacular effect and a new "mixed" frame consists of a die-cast aluminium and steel tubes joined with a technology of aeronautical origin. 
The Tornado Tre 900 super sport bike was launched in 2002, and the TNT, roadster some years later.

"The races improve the breed" and Merloni, a former driver, knew it well so the next step was to prepare the new Tornado for the races. As per his style, Merloni immediately began to run in 2001 and 2002 in the World Superbike Championship with the Australian rider Peter Goddard, who with his long experience has been able to give directions to improve the bike and consequently also the series. Given that the team was at the start and fierce competition, the results were higher than expected with a 36th place in the final classification in 2001 (with 7 points) and a 22nd place in 2002 (with 23 points). A limited version of the Tornado (named the Tornado LE, where LE stands for Limited Edition) was built.

The results of the new Benelli are encouraging but the strong investments for the Tornado are not compensated by sales and even Andrea Merloni decides to stop.

Current Qianjiang ownership 
In 2005, Benelli  was acquired by Qianjiang Motor Group, a Chinese company which has been controlled by the Geely Holding Group since 2015.

The Qianjiang Group is a Chinese manufacturer of small motorcycles and engines, which already owns the Keeway and Generic brands. Qianjiang decided to maintain production and engineering in Pesaro, entrusting the company to sole administrator Yan Haimei. The production of motorcycles started almost immediately with the assembly of 3-cylinder engines (previously performed by Franco Morini Motori) brought back to the marque. The scooter range also restarted with engines of Chinese origin.

For 12 years Benelli QJ carried out the projects and production of the previous management. 2016 was a breakthrough year, with coincided with the acquisition of Qianjiang Group by the Geely Holding Group. The Leoncino 500 and the TRK 500 are still made in Pesaro. Both motorcycles have the same 500 cc twin-cylinder 4 valve, double camshaft engine. The Leoncino is a "naked" bike with historic reference to past models. It comes in two versions, a roadster with 17" cast wheels, and a scrambler with longer suspension and spoked wheels. The TRK 500 is an "Adventure Bike" made for long-distance touring. It also comes in two models, the base model with cast 17" rims is a road touring machine, and the TRK502X is a more dirt-oriented machine. It has more suspension travel, spoked wheels, and a 2" higher seat height. In general, the success of TRK has been overwhelming. In 2020 it was by far the best-selling model in Italy. Benelli currently offers a very wide range of models from 125 single cylinder (135cc in some markets) to 300, 500, 750 twin cylinder and 600 four cylinder models.

Benelli is one of the oldest motorcycle brands in business in the world, and in 2021 celebrated the 110th anniversary of its foundation. The synergy with the know-how of the historic company in Italy and the parent company in China has turned out to be a winning move: Italian Style combined with the large economy of scale available from Chinese ownership have produced attractive models at very competitive costs.

Current products (2021)

Naked 

 BN 125
 TNT 125
 TNT 135 
 150S 
 180S 
 TNT 150i 
 TNT 25 / BN251
 TNT 300 / 302S 
 TNT 600 
 752S
 502 Cruiser (502C)

Sport 
 302R

Touring 

 TRK 251
 TRK 502
 TRK 502 X
 TNT 600 GT

Classic 

 Imperiale 400ES

Scramblers 

 Leoncino 250 
 Leoncino 500 / Leoncino 500 E5
 Leoncino 500 Trail / Leoncino 500 Trail E5
 Leoncino 500 Sport
 Leoncino 800 
 Leoncino 800 Trail

Scooters 

 RFS 150i 
 Caffenero 150 
 Zafferano 250

The Benelli and MotoBi Museum 
The Benelli and MotoBi museum is located in Pesaro, in Viale Mameli 22, right in the former workshops of the original factory, in use until the end of the 80s.

Of the original plant was "saved" only a building of just over a thousand square meters, the only example of industrial archeology of the city, which became the seat of the Officine Benelli Museum, managed by the Moto Club "Tonino Benelli" and the Benelli Historical Register (R.S.B.).
The "survivor" building of the old Benelli factory, at the time used as a warehouse, was perfectly restored with the supervision of the Superintendence of Fine Arts in the 2000s. In its rooms there are about 200 Benelli, MotoBi and more motorcycles on permanent display and from spring 2021 you can admire the prestigious ASI-Morbidelli collection.

The itinerary starts from the room dedicated to Dr. Paolo Prosperi (co-founder and historical president of the Historic Benelli Register dead in 2020) in which you can admire some motorbikes "symbol" of the over 100-year history of the Pesarese house, photographs of riders, technicians and characters who gave lustre and glory to Benelli and MotoBi, trophies of every era and Benelli, MotoBi and Molaroni engines.

It continues in the large room dedicated to Ing. Giuseppe Benelli in which, in addition to the first motorcycle that passed through Pesaro in 1897, a tricycle De Dion Bouton and motorcycles with engine of all kinds, two very rare Molaroni specimens of the twenties, there are the Benelli motorbikes built before the Second World War and a wide range of MotoBi from 1950 to 1970.

In the third hall two examples of Letizia, all types of the Leoncino model, the two cylinders two stroke, the four cylinders and six cylinders four stroke of the De Tomaso period, some models for the US market and a large series of high and low wheel mopeds.

Then the exhibition continues on a mezzanine floor of about 250 square meters. with scaffolding and wooden roof, where the ASI-Morbidelli Collection was placed it consists of 71 models from 30 brands from 9 countries, all models prior to the S.G.M. and two car models BBC (Version "Giardiniera" and Autotelaio with engine) produced by Giuseppe Benelli, finally, on an ideal "pit line", some rare examples of racing motorbikes built in the province of Pesaro and Urbino between the sixties and eighties: MotoBi, MBA, Morbidelli, Piovaticci and Sanvenero.

Palmares

Tonino Benelli, the younger of the six brothers, graduated as Italian Champion in 1927, 1928, 1930 and 1931, driving in the first three cases the Benelli 175 super sport monoalbero and in 1931 the bialbero. With the latter bike in 1932 will also conquer the square of honor in the European Championship, behind his teammate Carlo Baschieri. The Benelli motorcycles without Tonino, which had to interrupt his brilliant career as a driver in 1932 due to a serious accident occurred in the circuit of Tigullio, continued to reap successes and came to win again the European Title FICM in 1934 of the class "175" with the Belgian centaur Yvan Goor; in 1935 the world speed record of category of the Mile and the Km launched with the milanese rider Raffaele Alberti riding the "250" bialbero sport with 182.500 Km/h; in 1939 the Tourist Trophy with the English Ted Mellors always with a "250" bialbero sport.

After the war Benelli won two world titles in the 250 class with the Italian Dario Ambrosini in the 1950 World Championship and with the Australian Kelvin Carruthers in the 1969 World Championship; has also established itself in five Italian Speed Championships in the 250 class with Dario Ambrosini (1950), with the Emilian Tarquinio Provini (1965, 1966), with the Rimini Renzo Pasolini (1968, 1969); in three Italian Speed Championships in the 350 class with Pesaro driver Silvio Grassetti (1967) and again with Pasolini (1968, 1969). Numerous were the affirmations and the placings in the classic of great bottom of the epoch, the Milan-Taranto and the Motogiro d'Italia, with the Leoncino 125, decidedly the most iconic motorbike of Benelli of the years 50/60.

The Trofeo Pesaro Mobili, held at Villa Fastiggi in Pesaro, was attended by the greatest names in world motorcycling of the time as Giacomo Agostini, Mike Hailwood, Jarno Saarinen and Renzo Pasolini. In 1971 "Mike the Bike" riding an old Benelli "350" came second behind "Ago" driving the three-cylinder MV Agusta.

In the 1972 edition Jarno Saarinen riding the brand new Benelli motorbikes 4 cylinder "500" and "350" wins in both classes beating respectively Giacomo Agostini on MV Agusta and Renzo Pasolini on Aermacchi. The era of De Tomaso begins in promising way, but this will be the first and the last competition of its management. In fact the Italian-Argentine businessman, after the death in Zandvoort of the English pilot Piers Courage, driving a De Tomaso F1,
did not want to know any more about racing. Benelli will only return to compete in the 2000s in WSBK with the "Tornado 900 tre", the creature wanted by Andrea Merloni.

Race models (1927–2002)

European championship

MotoGP World Championship
 250 cc class; :

MotoGP World Constructors championship

Tourist Trophy Island Man

Italian Speed championship

See also

 Motobi
 Benelli Armi
 List of Benelli motorcycles
 List of Italian companies
 List of motorcycle manufacturers

References

External links

 Benelli official website 
 Officine Benelli - Benelli Heritage 
 OfficineBenelli-Mototeca Storica Marchigiana old site

 
Motorcycle manufacturers of Italy
Cycle manufacturers of Italy
Electric bicycles
Scooter manufacturers
Moped manufacturers
Italian brands
Vehicle manufacturing companies established in 1911
Italian companies established in 1911
Pesaro
Companies based in le Marche